The , more commonly known as simply JMDb, is an online database of information about Japanese movies, actors, and production crew personnel. It is similar to the Internet Movie Database but lists only those films initially released in Japan. Y. Nomura started the site in 1997, and it contains movies from 1899 (Second Year of Movies in Japan recorded) to the present day.

See also 
 IMDb

References

External links
  

Internet properties established in 1997
Japan
Online film databases